The Daily Guide (also called The Waynesvile Daily Guide and formerly the Fort Gateway Daily Guide) was a daily newspaper published in Pulaski County, Missouri, United States. It was owned by GateHouse Media, which shuttered it in 2018.

The paper's primary market was Waynesville, Missouri, though its offices were in neighboring St. Robert. The Daily Guide also covered neighboring Pulaski County cities such as Crocker, Dixon, Laquey and Richland.

External links 
 
 GateHouse Media

Newspapers published in Missouri
Pulaski County, Missouri
Newspapers established in 1971